William "Bill" Hoge (born April 2, 1946, in Pasadena, California) is an American politician from California and a member of the Republican Party.

After the 1991 redistricting the Pasadena, Altadena and Sunland-Tujunga areas gained their own GOP-leaning seat in the California State Assembly. Businessman Bill Hoge, backed by a host of conservatives, won a 10-way GOP primary and then defeated a weak Democrat to take this seat.

Democrats, meanwhile, considered Hoge vulnerable. They noted that despite the weakness of their nominee in 1992, Hoge still performed poorly. They recruited former Pasadena police chief Bruce Philpott to run against Hoge in 1994, but he was unsuccessful. In 1996 GOP state senate minority leader Rob Hurtt of Garden Grove tried to persuade Hoge to run for an open state senate seat. Hoge declined, thinking it was a safer bet to stay in the assembly. However, he was defeated for reelection by Democrat Jack Scott, former president of Pasadena City College.

Electoral history

References

Republican Party members of the California State Assembly
Living people
1946 births